The Alto Wore Tweed is the first novel in the St. Germaine mystery series by Mark Schweizer.

In this book, Hayden Koenig investigates the murder of a janitor found in the choirloft.

2002 American novels
St. Germaine (novel series)
American mystery novels
2002 debut novels